John McEnroe was the defending champion and was seeded no.1. He won the singles title at the 1981 Queen's Club Championships tennis tournament defeating compatriot Brian Gottfried in the final 7–6, 7–5.

Seeds

  John McEnroe (champion)
  Roscoe Tanner (third round)
  Brian Gottfried (final)
  Brian Teacher (semifinals)
  John Sadri (semifinals)
  Vijay Amritraj (first round)
  Fritz Buehning (first round)
  Paul McNamee (first round)
  Bill Scanlon (third round)
  Victor Amaya (third round)
  Kevin Curren (quarterfinals)
  Raúl Ramírez (first round)
  Phil Dent (third round)
  Pat Du Pré (first round)
  Chris Lewis (first round)
  John Austin (third round)

Draw

Finals

Top half

Section 1

Section 2

Bottom half

Section 3

Section 4

References

External links
Official website Queen's Club Championships 
ATP tournament profile

Singles